Raúl Banfi (born November 14, 1914, date of death unknown) was an Uruguayan professional football player. He was born in La Paz, Canelones. He also held Italian citizenship.

1914 births
Year of death missing
Uruguayan people of Italian descent
Uruguayan footballers
Uruguayan expatriate footballers
Racing Club de Montevideo players
Serie A players
Serie B players
Modena F.C. players
Juventus F.C. players
Mantova 1911 players
A.C. Prato players
Expatriate footballers in Italy
Association football forwards